Eriocaulon ratnagiricum is a critically endangered monocotyledonous plant only recorded near Ratnagiri in the state of Maharashtra, India. It is a small annual which grows on the edges of temporary pools on lateritic plateaus.

References

ratnagiricum
Flora of Maharashtra